Olof Peter Swartz (21 September 1760 – 19 September 1818) was a Swedish botanist and taxonomist.  He is best known for his taxonomic work and studies into pteridophytes.

Biography
Olof Swartz  attended the University of Uppsala where he studied under Carl Linnaeus the Younger (1741–1783) and received his doctorate in 1781.  
He first traveled in 1780  to Lapland in the company of several other botanists.  

In 1783 he sailed for North America and the West Indies, primarily in the area of Jamaica and Hispaniola, to collect botanical specimens.  
His botanical collection, of an impressive 6000 specimens, is now held by the Swedish Museum of Natural History, as part of the Regnellian herbarium.

By 1786 he left for London to prepare his collection.  There he met naturalist Joseph Banks (1743–1820), who was impressed with his knowledge of Botany.  He was offered a position with the British East India Company as a travelling physician, but turned it down, and returned to Sweden in 1787. Ten years later he proposed to the Royal Swedish Academy of Sciences (of which he became a member in 1789) the idea of a permanent travel grant, based on the methods he had seen employed by Joseph Banks within the British Empire. In 1791 he became Professor Bergianus at the Academy of Sciences at Stockholm. He was elected a Foreign Honorary Member of the American Academy of Arts and Sciences in 1805.
 He was elected a member of the American Philosophical Society in 1806.

Swartz was the first specialist of orchid taxonomy, who published a critical review of orchid literature and classified the 25 genera that he recognized through his work.  He was also the first to realize that most orchids have one stamen, while slipper orchids have two.
 
The genus Swartzia (Caesalpiniaceae, Fabaceae or Leguminosae) was named in his honour by Schreber. Then Schwartzia, which is a genus of flowering plants belonging to the family Marcgraviaceae was named in 1829 by Vell.

Selected works
 Nova genera et species plantarum seu prodromus, 1788 
 Observationes botanicae, 1791
 Icones plantarum incognitarum, illustrating the rare plants of the West Indies (Upsala, 1794-1800)
 Flora Indiae occidentalis,  (3 vols., 1797-1806)
 Synopsis Filicum, 1806
 Lichenes Americani (Nuremberg, 1811)
 Summa vegetabilium Scandinaviae, 1814

See also
 :Category:Taxa named by Olof Swartz

References

Further reading
 Kurt Polycarp Joachim Sprengel (1823) Memoir of the life and writings of Olaus Swartz  (Edinburgh:  A. Constable)

Note

External links
Digitised versions of works by Swartz
BDH Flora Indiae Occidentalis :aucta atque illustrata sive descriptiones plantarum in prodromo recensitarum 
BDH Lichenes Americani : quos partim in Flora Indiae Occidentalis descripsit, partim e regionibus diversis Americae obtinuit  Illustrations by Jacob Sturm
BDHNova genera & species plantarum; seu, Prodromus descriptionum vegetabilium, maximam partem incognitorum quae sub itinere in Indiam Occidentalem annis 1783-87 
BDH Observationes botanicae :quibus plantae Indiae Occidentalis aliaeque Systematis vegetabilium ed. XIV illustrantur earumque characteres passim emendantur 
BDH Svensk botanik

1760 births
1816 deaths
People from Norrköping
Uppsala University alumni
Orchidologists
Pteridologists
Botanists active in the Caribbean
Fellows of the American Academy of Arts and Sciences
Members of the Royal Swedish Academy of Sciences
Swedish taxonomists
18th-century Swedish botanists
19th-century Swedish botanists